The 1989 Kentucky Wildcats football team represented the University of Kentucky in the 1989 NCAA Division I-A football season. The Wildcats scored 212 points while allowing 220 points.  This was Jerry Claiborne's eighth and final season as Kentucky's head coach.

Season
Kentucky opened with wins against Indiana and North Carolina, lost to Alabama and Auburn, beat Rutgers and LSU, lost at Georgia, beat Cincinnati and Vanderbilt, and lost to Florida and Tennessee.

Schedule

Team players in the 1990 NFL Draft

References

Kentucky
Kentucky Wildcats football seasons
Kentucky Wildcats football